The Brockville and Ottawa Railway (B&O) was an early railway in Upper Canada, today's Ontario. It ran north from the town of Brockville on the Saint Lawrence River to Sand Point on the Ottawa River. It was built primarily to serve the timber trade on the Ottawa Valley, shortcutting routes that led into the city of Ottawa, further downstream. The first railway tunnel in Canada, the Brockville Tunnel, was dug in order to allow the B&O to reach the port lands on the south side of the city, which sits on a bluff.

A second railway company, the Canada Central Railway (CCR), was chartered to run from the B&O at Carleton Place to the LeBreton Flats on the west side of downtown Ottawa. The two companies were later merged under the Canada Central name, and continued to push northward to Mattawa. The line was leased by the Canadian Pacific Railway and merged in 1881, and was later extended to North Bay and Sudbury. CP used the original CC routing as their primary access to Ottawa, joining it to the Ontario and Quebec Railway (O&Q) at Perth. The O&Q was later abandoned and replaced by a new line running through Belleville.

Much of the original B&O and CCR routes remain in active use. CP maintained ownership of the tracks between Smiths Falls and Brockville (known as the CP Brockville Sub) until November  2015, when Via Rail acquired this section for its Ottawa - Toronto service.

See also

 List of Ontario railways
 List of defunct Canadian railways

References

 
 

Defunct Ontario railways
Canadian Pacific Railway subsidiaries
History of rail transport in Leeds and Grenville United Counties
5 ft 6 in gauge railways in Canada